The Watchful Gods and Other Stories is a collection of short stories by Walter Van Tilburg Clark published in 1950. It brings together eight stories and one novella (the title story). Three of the stories had already appeared in the annual anthology of O. Henry Award-winning stories, most notably "The Wind and the Snow of Winter" which was selected by that anthology, in 1945, as their "first-place winner." Since this book's publication, two other stories have remained notable: "The Portable Phonograph" and "Hook" have both been widely anthologized since they were published.

This is the only short story collection that Clark ever published. Along with a few of these stories, Clark is best known for his first novel, the classic Western The Ox-Bow Incident, which was published in 1940.

Contents 
The stories in the book appear in the following sequence:
"Hook"
"The Wind and the Snow of Winter"  
"The Rapids"
 "The Anonymous"
 "The Buck in the Hills"*
 "Why Don't You Look Where You're Going?"*
 "The Indian Well"
 "The Fish Who Could Close His Eyes"
"The Portable Phonograph" 
"The Watchful Gods"

Background 
Of the nine stories in this volume, "Hook" first appeared in The Atlantic Monthly; "The Wind and the Snow of Winter" and "The Portable Photograph" in The Yale Review; "The Rapids", "Why Don't You Look Where You're Going?", and "The Indian Well" in Accent; "The Anonymous" in The Virginia Quarterly Review; "The Buck in the Hills" in The Rocky Mountain Review; "The Fish Who Could Close His Eyes" in Tomorrow. The novella, "The Watchful Gods" is published here for the first time.
Clark dedicated this book: for A.E. Hill.

Reception 
After they began appearing in national magazines during the 1940s, Clark's short stories gained national recognition, and earned five O. Henry Prize's between 1941 and 1945. These were:
"Hook" in 1941. 
"The Portable Photograph" in 1942.
"The Return of Ariel Goodbody" in 1943. Note that this story was not republished in The Watchful Gods and it remains uncollected.
"The Buck in the Hills'' in 1944.
"The Wind And The Snow Of Winter" in 1945, and was the O. Henry anthology "first prize winner" for that year.

Since this initial success, some of these stories, notably "Hook" and "The Wind And The Snow Of Winter," have consistently been anthologized as classic examples of the genre. "The Portable Phonograph" has also received steady attention during the years since it was first published.

Notes

See also

References

External links
 Publisher's Page for Watchful Gods via Wayback Machine

1950 short story collections
American short story collections
Random House books